Mutilation is a demo album by American death metal band Death, released in 1986. The following year, the band would release their full-length debut album, Scream Bloody Gore on Combat Records. American heavy metal magazine Metal Maniacs noted that the demo was "the most polished of the early Death recordings" and that "the underground and Combat Records were in agreement about Mutilation".

Writer Albert Mudrian noted in his book Choosing Death: The Improbable History of Death Metal & Grindcore that the Mutilation demo "earned [Chuck] Schuldiner that elusive recording contract", stating it was "the band's most polished material in the form of the three-track demo". Author Ian Christe, in his book Sound of the Beast: The Complete Headbanging History of Heavy Metal, noted that Death's demos "became as heavily shared by tape traders as any well-established act in metal".

Track listing

Personnel
Credits adapted from liner notes.

Death 
Chuck Schuldiner – lead vocals, guitar, bass guitar
Chris Reifert –  drums

Additional personnel 
Mark Sikora – artwork

References

Death (metal band) albums
1986 albums
Demo albums